P. Sachidanandan (born 1936), who uses the pseudonym Anand, is an Indian writer, writing primarily in Malayalam. He is one of the known living intellectuals in India. His works are noted for their philosophical flavor, historical context and their humanism. He is a recipient of the Sahitya Akademi Award and three Kerala Sahitya Akademi Awards (story, novel, and scholarly literature). He is also a recipient of Ezhuthachan Puraskaram, Vayalar Award, Odakkuzhal Award, Muttathu Varkey Award, Vallathol Award and Yashpal Award. He did not accept the Yashpal Award and the Kerala Sahitya Akademi Award for Novel.

Life
Sachidanandan was born in 1936 to a primary school teacher at Irinjalakuda in the Thrissur district (Trichur) of Kerala. He graduated in Civil Engineering from College of Engineering, Trivandrum in 1958. He retired as Planning Director of the Central Water Commission after a career which included extended stints working in Gujarat, Mumbai and Bengal. He also worked in the military (North-East Frontier Agency) for four years during 1960–64 in the Short Service Commission.

Anand resides in Delhi.

Writing
It was the famous critic M. Govindan who helped Anand publish his maiden novel Alkkoottam. At age 34, it was his first ever published work. It was a new experience for the Malayalee readers and the book received rave reviews and pungent criticisms alike. He followed Alkkoottam (Crowd) with three more equally abstract novels: Maranacertificate (Death Certificate), Abhayarthikal (Refugees) and Utharayanam. These books made Anand a writer with considerable standing in Malayalam. But it was in the late eighties and early nineties that Anand came up with two more novels, Marubhoomikal Undakunnathu and Govardhanante Yaathrakal, which made him an icon in Malayalam literature.

Contemporary Malayalam writer M. Mukundan made the following comment about Anand's style.
Anand's is the most articulate voice in Kerala today, which questions the moral premises of politics and most importantly, resists Hindu fundamentalism. His essays and novels unmistakably establish a metaphor of resistance. The prose in Anand's novels is taut - no moon will ever rise in it, nor flowers blossom or river breezes waft through. His language, stripped to the bone, sometimes challenges the reader to go through it.

Anand has also written many short stories and articles, most of which deal with plight of the ordinary people who are exploited by the people in power. His characters are not necessarily a Malayali, and often weaves in historical elements into his stories. More often they are also located outside Kerala. He is also a prolific essayist. He occasionally writes poems also.

Awards

 Kerala Sahitya Akademi Award for Story, 1981
 Kerala Sahitya Akademi Award for Novel, 1985
 Vayalar Award, 1993
 Kerala Sahitya Akademi Award for Scholarly Literature, 1994
 Odakkuzhal Award, 1996
 Sahitya Akademi Award, 1997
 Muttathu Varkey Award, 2000
 Sahitya Akademi Translation Prize, 2012
 Vallathol Award, 2015
 Ezhuthachan Puraskaram, 2019

Criticisms
The 'abstractness' of Anand's writing has been a cause for criticism, from people alleging he does not actually name concrete people and organizations, instead relying on a historical and abstract narrative, even in his political essays. Balachandran Chullikkadu, a well-known poet in Malayalam, once said that Anand is the messiah of NGOs.

Books by Anand

Novels and novellas 
 Marana Certificate (Death Certificate ) Current Books. 1974. . 
 
  Received 1997 Sahitya Akademi Award 
 
 Aalkkoottam (The Crowd) (1st DCB ed.). Kōṭṭayaṃ: DC Books. 1998. . 
 Utharayanam (in Malayalam). DC Books.

Short story collection

Dramas 
 Savaghoshyathra
 Mukthipadham

Other books

Poems

Translations in English

References

Further reading

External links

 
 
 

1936 births
Living people
Novelists from Kerala
Malayalam-language writers
Engineers from Kerala
Malayalam novelists
Recipients of the Sahitya Akademi Award in Malayalam
Recipients of the Kerala Sahitya Akademi Award
People from Irinjalakuda
20th-century Indian novelists
Indian male novelists
Indian irrigation engineers
20th-century Indian engineers
20th-century Indian male writers
Malayalam poets
Recipients of the Sahitya Akademi Prize for Translation